Porky's Preview is a Warner Bros. Looney Tunes cartoon directed by Tex Avery. The short was released on April 19, 1941, and stars Porky Pig.

Plot
Porky Pig has arranged the screening of a film in a film theater for an audience of barnyard animals. The public goes to the ticket booth. A chicken buys tickets for herself and her three "children" (eggs). A kangaroo tears the tickets (and even the hand that holds it) and throws them in his pouch. A firefly usher leads the audience with his hindquarters as a bright lamp. A skunk has a "scent" (pun on smelling it, and 1 cent of a dollar) and cannot enter, so he goes through the back door. On stage Porky presents the film he made himself. The accompanying music is a version of the flickering that usually introduced cartoons of Looney Tunes. The film turns out to be a series of small sketches of primitive characters drawn with stick figures, minimalist, with settings that seem to have been penciled by a child. After the film, Porky is surprised to see the theatre in shambles. The only audience remaining is the skunk (whose presence drove away everyone else). The skunk enthusiastically applauds Porky's film.

Analysis
The basic premise of the film is that a 7-year-old Porky has created a "homemade" animated cartoon, and demonstrates it to an audience willing to pay an admission fee. The artistic skills of the child are minimal, so the film within a film is depicted in a very simple style. Effectively serving as a parody of its art form. All fictional characters within it are drawn as stick figures, while the animation style is reminiscent of a flip book.

For this film within a film, Tex Avery uses a series of blackout gags. Carl Stalling accompanies each joke with a tune already familiar to the audience. Among them are La Cucaracha (first mentioned c. 1819), "Aloha ʻOe" (1878), "The Old Gray Mare" (written between 1875 and 1895), "Frat" (1910, a frequent Warner cartoon staple) and "September in the Rain" (from a 1937 Warner film and sung by an Al Jolson imitator). Stalling also parodies the typical music score of shorts produced by Warner Bros. Cartoons. The credits of the film within a film make use of The Merry-Go-Round Broke Down (1937), but the familiar tune is simplified, giving the impression that it is played by an amateur. A number of notes are repeated, in the style of a broken record which repeats over and over.

The film includes some references to war. When a skunk approaches the box office, the lady working there wears a gas mask to endure its scent. The self-portrait of Porky is marked as draft No. .

Reception
The Film Daily called the short a "fair cartoon", saying, "Some of the characterizations are amusing... Rate it as just fair."

Television Edits
The "September In The Rain" clip has been removed from Nickelodeon, Cartoon Network, and a few VHS prints in the United States due to its racist content.

References

External links

Porky's Preview (Colorized) on the Internet Archive

1941 films
1941 animated films
1940s American animated films
1940s animated short films
Looney Tunes shorts
Films directed by Tex Avery
Films set in a movie theatre
Porky Pig films
Films scored by Carl Stalling
American black-and-white films